The lowland peltops or clicking shieldbill (Peltops blainvillii) is a species of bird in the family Artamidae.
It is found in Indonesia and Papua New Guinea.
Its natural habitat is subtropical or tropical moist lowland forest.

References

External links
Image at ADW

Peltops
Birds described in 1827
Taxa named by Prosper Garnot
Taxonomy articles created by Polbot